El Sayyid Nosair (born 16 November 1955) is an Egyptian-born American citizen, convicted of involvement in the 1993 New York City landmark bomb plot. He had earlier been tried for, but acquitted of, the 1990 New York City assassination of Meir Kahane, a Jewish Rabbi, far-right Israeli militant, politician, and founder of the Jewish Defense League. He later admitted to having committed this assassination as well.

In 1994, Nosair was convicted in federal court of nine counts, including seditious conspiracy, murder in aid of racketeering, attempted murder in aid of racketeering, attempted murder of a U.S. Postal Inspection Service officer, use of a firearm in the commission of a murder, use of a firearm during an attempted murder, and possession of a firearm.

Background
El Sayyid Nosair was born in 1955 in Port Said, Egypt, and immigrated to the United States in 1981. He became an American citizen in 1989. In the United States, Nosair worked various jobs in New Jersey and New York City.  Nosair was employed by the City of New York to repair the air conditioning equipment at the criminal courts building.

Nosair expressed dislike for American culture and what he perceived to be rampant moral corruption. Nosair became involved with the al-Farouq Mosque in Brooklyn, which was supported by the Maktab al-Khadamat (Services Office), which was established in 1984 by Osama bin Laden and Abdullah Azzam in Peshawar, Pakistan. The purpose of the Services Office was to raise funds for the Arab mujahadeen during the Soviet–Afghan War, as well as recruitment. Ali Mohamed, a sergeant at Fort Bragg, provided United States Army manuals and other assistance to individuals at the al-Farouq Mosque, and some members, including Mahmoud Abouhalima and Nosair, practiced at the Calverton Shooting Range on Long Island, many of the group wearing shirts reading "Help Each Other in Goodness and Piety...A Muslim to a Muslim is a Brick Wall" with a map of Afghanistan emblazoned in the middle.

Assassination of Meir Kahane
In 1990, Nosair was accused of assassinating Rabbi Meir Kahane, the founder of the Jewish Defense League in the US and of the Kach party and terrorist organization in Israel, and formerly a member of the Israeli Knesset. Kahane was killed on November 5, 1990, shortly after 9:00p.m., following a speech to an audience of mostly Orthodox Jews from Brooklyn. A crowd of well-wishers gathered around Kahane following the speech in the second-floor lecture hall in midtown Manhattan's Marriott East Side Hotel. Following a skirmish, Nosair was shot by Carlos Acosta, a police officer for the United States Postal Inspection Service. The two continued to exchange gunfire before Nosair was apprehended.  Nosair was taken to Bellevue Hospital for treatment of his wounds.

Trial
During legal proceedings, Nosair largely ignored the court and focused on multiple sketches he made of Princess Diana.

In a verdict described by law professor Jeffrey B. Abramson as "bizarre", a jury in December 1991 acquitted Nosair of Kahane's murder but convicted him of assault and possession of an illegal firearm. He was also convicted of related charges, including shooting Acosta. He was defended by William Kunstler (along with two co-counsels), who at first advised him to plead insanity. When Nosair refused, the defense argued that there had been a conspiracy against Nosair, and Kahane might have been killed by one of his followers.  Kunstler saw the composition of the jury (which he described as being made up of "third-world people" and "people who were not yuppies or establishment types") as crucial to the verdict.

The judge in the trial, Justice Alvin Schlesinger, said that the jury's acquittal of Nosair on the murder charge was "against the overwhelming weight of evidence and was devoid of common sense and logic". The judge added that he believed Nosair "conducted a rape of this country, of our Constitution and of our laws, and of people seeking to exist peacefully together." On January 29, 1992, he sentenced Nosair to 7 to 22 years in prison, the maximum allowed.

Kunstler also saw the verdict as irrational, promising to appeal Nosair's convictions.

Conspiracy to free Nosair from prison
Nosair was originally sentenced to serve his time at the Attica State Prison in New York. It was reported that prior to his arrest, Omar Abdul-Rahman (the "Blind Sheikh") and his followers had conducted detailed surveillance of the facility, and they had also discussed plans to rescue Nosair from prison by launching a truck bomb attack combined with an armed assault.

Terrorist conspiracy conviction
Nosair was still serving time in state prison when he was convicted as part of the federal trial of the "Blind Sheik" Omar Abdel-Rahman. Both received life sentences without the possibility of parole for their involvement in a terrorist conspiracy, in Nosair's case life plus 15 years' imprisonment. It was ruled that Kahane's death was part of the total "seditious conspiracy". Nosair was convicted of nine counts, including conspiracy to use explosives against New York landmarks, seditious conspiracy, plotting to assassinate U.S. politicians, murder of Kahane in aid of racketeering, attempted murder in aid of racketeering, attempted murder of a postal police officer, use of a firearm in the commission of a murder, use of a firearm in an attempted murder, and possession of a firearm; he received life plus 15 years of imprisonment. Nosair's relatives obtained funds from Osama bin Laden to pay for Nosair's defense.

Link to Osama bin Laden
In 2002, Eleanor Hill, director of the Senate Intelligence Committee investigating intelligence failures prior to the September 11, 2001, attacks, reported that Nosair had links with terrorist organizations in Pakistan and that Osama bin Laden helped pay for his legal defense during his trial for the assassination of Meir Kahane. The FBI learned that one of Nosair's relatives traveled to Saudi Arabia and acquired funds from Osama bin Laden to fund Nosair's legal defense. Ron Kuby, one of Nosair's lawyers, later stated that a cousin of Nosair's had pooled money together with Nosair's family to raise money for his legal defense.

Possible accomplices in Kahane's assassination
In August 2010, the Israeli newspaper The Jerusalem Post, referencing the August issue of Playboy, claimed that Nosair had two partners and that his original target was Israeli military figure and future Prime Minister of Israel Ariel Sharon. The article states: "He added that on the night he shot Kahane dead, he was accompanied by two co-conspirators to the Marriot Hotel in Manhattan where Kahane was speaking – one of whom was also carrying a gun. The men, Bilal al-Kaisi of Jordan and Mohammed A. Salameh, a Palestinian illegal alien who was later involved in the 1993 World Trade Center bombing, have never been charged for their part in the slaying."

Family
Nosair married Karen Mills, a native of Pittsburgh who changed her given name to Khadijah when she converted from Roman Catholicism to Islam in 1982. The couple had two sons, and they raised a daughter from Khadijah's previous marriage. One of Nosair's sons, born Abdulaziz El Sayyid Nosair, changed his name to Zak Ebrahim and now works as a peace activist. He released his first book, The Terrorist's Son: A Story of Choice in September 2014.

See also

 1993 World Trade Center bombing

References

1955 births
Living people
American Muslims
American assassins
Egyptian assassins
Egyptian Muslims
People imprisoned on charges of terrorism
Inmates of ADX Florence
Prisoners and detainees of New York (state)
American prisoners sentenced to life imprisonment
Egyptian prisoners sentenced to life imprisonment
Egyptian people imprisoned abroad
Prisoners sentenced to life imprisonment by the United States federal government
People acquitted of murder
People convicted of assault
American people convicted of attempted murder
People convicted of racketeering
People from Port Said
Egyptian emigrants to the United States
Meir Kahane